Dowdall Cross is a wayside cross and National Monument located in County Meath, Ireland.

Location

Dowdall Cross is located in Duleek, near the junction of Main Street and Abbey Road.

Description
The Dowdall Cross was erected by Dame Jennet Dowdall in 1601 as a memorial to her first husband, Sir William Bathe. The cross, repaired in 1810, is one of a series of crosses constructed by Dowdall in memory of Bathe. The cross is made of limestone and is elaborately carved with images of many saints.

References

Archaeological sites in County Meath
National Monuments in County Meath